El Rourell is a municipality in the comarca of Alt Camp, Tarragona, Catalonia, Spain.

The name is derived Rourell oak tree that is depicted in the arms of the people.

The site originally and it seems that at least in part was integrated into the larger end of Quince. Was given between 1150 and 1158 to Molnells by Ramon Berenguer IV and Archbishop Bernard of Tort. In Berenguer Molnells to join the Order of the Templars, and donations made in the Rourell since played an important role within the organization Templar. Thus was formed the Order of Rourell, depending on the Barbera. Before the extinction of the order became the miter Tarragona. There you have rights and the Plegamans Baldrich Marquis of Vallgornera, owners of much of the term. We can say without doubt that until a few years Rourell still retained significant aspects of feudal times.

References

External links 
 Website of the Municipality
 All information on this municipality
 Government data pages 

Municipalities in Alt Camp